LSPM J0207+3331 is, the oldest and coldest known white dwarf star to host a circumstellar disk, located 145 light-years from Earth.  It was discovered in October 2018 by a volunteer participating in the Backyard Worlds citizen science project.

Because white dwarfs are such dense objects, LSPM J0207 has a mass of about 0.69 . The presence of the Paschen Beta-Line in a near-infrared spectrum from the Keck telescope helped to determine that the atmosphere of LSPM J0207 is dominated by hydrogen (spectral type DA). Due to the inner disk around the white dwarf, it should be expected that the atmosphere has a lot of other elements and that the white dwarf is a metal-polluted white dwarf. To confirm this hypothesis, it is required to take an optical spectrum of the white dwarf.

Debris Disk 
The star has a circumstellar disk despite being 3 billion years old. It may be a debris disk created from asteroids broken apart by the star's gravity.

The outer disk is optically thin. This suggests that the outer disk formed relative recently from a tidal disruption of such a small body. If this outer disk is confirmed, it would be the first known dusty white dwarf with a two-component ring system. Alternatively the gap in the disk could be explained by a dense exoplanet orbiting inside the disk and clearing a gap, or a planet orbiting outside the disk and opening a gap via resonant dynamics.

Due to the inner edge of the inner disk being located near the sublimation radius of fayalite and iron, it is suggested that the inner disk is composed of these materials. It is however not excluded that forsterite is a component of the inner disk.

Models predict only a low rate of asteroids to be disrupted by an old white dwarf. The 1 Gyr simulations by Debes et al. found that only one asteroid per simulation was disrupted 200 Myrs after the white dwarf has formed. The presence of a disk around a 3 Gyr white dwarf sets new demands for models that seek to explain dust around white dwarfs.

References

White dwarfs
Triangulum (constellation)
Circumstellar disks
J02073383+3331296
Astronomical objects discovered in 2018
TIC objects